Juho Heikki Kananen (28 August 1874, Heinävesi – 4 March 1955) was a Finnish smallholder and politician. He served as a Member of the Parliament of Finland from 1911 to 1913 and from 1919 to 1922, representing the Social Democratic Party of Finland (SDP).

References

1874 births
1955 deaths
People from Heinävesi
People from Mikkeli Province (Grand Duchy of Finland)
Social Democratic Party of Finland politicians
Members of the Parliament of Finland (1911–13)
Members of the Parliament of Finland (1919–22)